Matteo Cressoni (born October 28, 1984 in Mantua) is an Italian racing driver. He has competed in such series as the FIA GT Championship, Euroseries 3000, Superstars Series, International GT Open and Formula Renault V6 Eurocup.

Racing record

Complete GT1 World Championship results

Complete 24 Hours of Le Mans results

Complete FIA World Endurance Championship results
(key) (Races in bold indicate pole position; races in
italics indicate fastest lap)

References

External links
 Official website
 Career statistics from Driver Database

1984 births
Living people
Sportspeople from Mantua
Italian racing drivers
Italian Formula Renault 2.0 drivers
Formula Renault V6 Eurocup drivers
Auto GP drivers
Italian Formula Three Championship drivers
FIA GT Championship drivers
American Le Mans Series drivers
European Le Mans Series drivers
FIA GT1 World Championship drivers
Superstars Series drivers
Blancpain Endurance Series drivers
International GT Open drivers
24 Hours of Daytona drivers
24 Hours of Le Mans drivers
24 Hours of Spa drivers
Asian Le Mans Series drivers
FIA World Endurance Championship drivers
24H Series drivers
WeatherTech SportsCar Championship drivers
GT World Challenge America drivers

AF Corse drivers
Drivex drivers
Ombra Racing drivers
RP Motorsport drivers
Le Mans Cup drivers
Iron Lynx drivers